Buckley Country Day School is an independent, coeducational day school providing elementary and middle education to 330 students in grades toddler through eight in Roslyn, New York State, United States. Buckley was founded in 1923 and opened the doors of its first building in Great Neck to a class of twenty-three children. It was begun as a day school but for a period accepted boarding students in the middle grades.

In 1955, as the school's enrollment continued to increase, Buckley moved to its current location in the Village of North Hills in Roslyn. It is operated on a not-for-profit basis by an appointed twenty-two-member Board of Trustees. It is chartered by the Board of Regents of the University of the State of New York. The school is accredited by the New York State Association of Independent Schools and is a member of the National Association of Independent Schools.

The campus
Buckley has a  campus, which includes a classroom building, library, three athletic fields, tennis courts, and a playground. The building houses all the classrooms, two science labs, two computer labs, an art studio, a woodshop, and three gymnasiums. The recently completed Hagedorn Library Learning Center contains over 16,000 volumes and is used by students from as early as nursery school.

The campus includes four outdoor swimming pools, which are open only in the summer during Buckley Camp and end-of-the-year parties, and a pond.

The campus was developed on land once part of a colonial farm owned by Isaac Underhill Willets.

Traditions
Buckley maintains a number of traditions. Every 8th grader designs and carves a square foot wooden plaque; these are installed in the hallways of the school. These plaques contain the name and graduation year of the individual student; they date to 1927. Both the 8th grade and 3rd grade produce annual plays. Each year the 1st graders perform The Nutcracker ballet. Since 1973, the school has held an annual fall fair in October.

Athletics
Red-Blue Field Day is held annually in the spring. The school's two "red" and "blue" teams compete. This tradition started in 1935 and as of 2018 the Red team is leading 46 to 38. Student records on field day are kept, the oldest being from 1981.

Pop culture
Some scenes in School of Rock, such as those in the cafeteria and the teacher's lounge (Room One), were filmed at Buckley.

Notable alumni
Marshall Cassidy, class of 1959, horse race official and announcer
Lyn Coffin, class of 1957, author
Barbara Cooney, children's author and illustrator, winner of two Caldecott Medals
Melissa Errico, actress
Thelma Golden, class of 1980, Director and Chief Curator of the Studio Museum in Harlem
Julian Lombardi, computer science professor at Duke University
John McEnroe, former World No. 1 professional tennis player
Patrick McEnroe, professional tennis player
Leslie Peirez, class of 1984, television producer
Nicole Petallides, class of 1984, Fox Business Network anchor
Esther Rantzen, class of 1950, broadcaster
Gregory Raposo, pop singer, formerly a member of teen boy band Dream Street
Amber Scott, former child actress (Maggie Banning in Hook)
William Zinsser, class of 1936, writer and historian

Notable faculty
Roby Young, former captain of the Israel national football team

References

External links

Buckley homepage
Hagedorn Library Learning Center
Buckley Camp

Educational institutions established in 1923
Private elementary schools in New York (state)
Schools in Nassau County, New York
Private middle schools in New York (state)
1923 establishments in New York (state)